Horacio Andrés Ameli, better known as Horacio Ameli (born July 7, 1974 in Rosario), is a former Argentine football defender, who played in several top level clubs of countries such as Argentina, Brazil, Mexico and Spain.

History
Horacio Ameli started his professional career in 1994, defending Colón, leaving the club in 1996 to defend Spanish side Rayo Vallecano. He returned to his native country in 1998, to defend San Lorenzo, moving to Brazil in 2002 to defend Internacional. With Inter, he played two Copa do Brasil games in 2002. Ameli then moved to São Paulo in the same year, playing 13 Série A games between 2002 and 2003, and scoring one goal. He returned to Argentina in 2003 to play for River Plate, leaving in the following year to play for Mexican club América. Horacio Ameli returned again to Argentina in 2005, then retired in 2006, while defending Colón.

References

1974 births
Living people
Footballers from Rosario, Santa Fe
Argentine footballers
Argentine expatriate footballers
Expatriate footballers in Brazil
Expatriate footballers in Mexico
Expatriate footballers in Spain
Club Atlético Colón footballers
Rayo Vallecano players
San Lorenzo de Almagro footballers
Sport Club Internacional players
São Paulo FC players
Club Atlético River Plate footballers
Club América footballers
La Liga players
Segunda División players
Campeonato Brasileiro Série A players
Liga MX players
Argentine expatriate sportspeople in Brazil
Argentine expatriate sportspeople in Mexico
Argentine expatriate sportspeople in Spain
Association football defenders